Pedro Rodríguez y Lazala (1869 – October 25, 1932), also known as Nyoy Endong and the Grand Old Man of Bogo was a Filipino politician. He served as Presidente Municipal of Bogo, Cebu and was one of the first members of the Philippine Assembly. 

Rodríguez was born in Medellin, Cebu and he attended the seminary of San Carlos and proceeded to the Ateneo de Manila where he graduated with a B.S. in Agricultural Engineering. He came from wealthy Bogo family with extensive landholdings in the northern sugar-belt towns of the province. Rodríguez was appointed as Municipal President of Bogo between 1898 until 1903. In 1905, he went to Spain as a delegate of the Philippine Assembly. In 1907, his brother, Celestino Rodríguez became senator deputised in the district. During his administration, he was part and given the leadership at the Inauguration of Independence held at the Old Plaza in Cebu, he said: "In our world, there are two respected mountains, namely Mount Sinai and Mount Sudlong. But the Filipinos love most Mount Sudlong because on its top… is where the first Philippine flag was raised in the skies of Cebu… where blood of our brothers spilled to fight for our country…" His high achievement as senator enabled him to become a member of the Nacionalista Party and he also served as a Senatorial District governor.

Two streets and a barangay in Bogo were named after him.

References 

1869 births
1932 deaths
Senators of the 8th Philippine Legislature
Senators of the 7th Philippine Legislature
Visayan people
Nacionalista Party politicians
Ateneo de Manila University alumni
People from Bogo, Cebu

Mayors of places in Cebu
Members of the House of Representatives of the Philippines from Cebu